The 2013–14 Bundesliga was the 51st season of the Bundesliga, Germany's premier football league. The season began on 9 August 2013 and the final matchday was on 10 May 2014. The winter break started on 23 December 2013 and ended on 24 January 2014.

Bayern Munich were the defending champions and officially clinched the championship on 25 March 2014 after defeating Hertha BSC, on the 27th matchday of the season. This broke their previous record from last season, where Bayern clinched the Bundesliga on matchday 28.

Teams
A total of 18 teams were contesting the league, including 15 sides from the 2012–13 season and two sides promoted directly from the 2012–13 2. Bundesliga season. Fortuna Düsseldorf and Greuther Fürth were relegated from the Bundesliga after a single season and were replaced by Hertha Berlin, 2. Bundesliga champions and runners-up Eintracht Braunschweig. Hertha made an immediate return to the top level, but Eintracht made their first appearance after 28 years in the second and third levels. The final participant was determined in the two-legged play-off, in which 16th placed Bundesliga side TSG 1899 Hoffenheim defeated 1. FC Kaiserslautern, who finished third in 2. Bundesliga.

2013–14 Teams

 Bayern Munich
 Borussia Dortmund
 Bayer Leverkusen
 Schalke 04
 SC Freiburg
 Eintracht Frankfurt
 Hamburger SV
 Borussia Mönchengladbach
 Hannover 96

 1. FC Nürnberg
 VfL Wolfsburg
 VfB Stuttgart
 FSV Mainz 05
 Werder Bremen
 FC Augsburg
 TSG 1899 Hoffenheim (winner of the promotion-relegation play-off)
 Hertha BSC (2012–13 2. Bundesliga champion)
 Eintracht Braunschweig (2012–13 2. Bundesliga runner-up)

Stadiums and locations

Personnel and kits
As of 19 February 2014.

Managerial changes

Notes
 Werder Bremen and Thomas Schaaf terminated their contract after the penultimate matchday of the 2012–13 season. Robin Dutt was named as the new permanent manager in the off-season.
 Announced on 16 January 2013.
 Announced on 15 May 2013.

League table

Results

Relegation play-offs
Hamburger SV, who finished 16th, faced SpVgg Greuther Fürth, the 3rd-placed 2013–14 2. Bundesliga side for a two-legged play-off. The winner on aggregate score after both matches  earned entry into the 2014–15 Bundesliga. Hamburger SV prevailed, avoiding their possible first relegation.

First leg

Second leg

1–1 on aggregate. Hamburg won on away goals.

Statistics

Top scorers
As of 10 May 2014

Number of teams by state

References

External links

 2013–14 Bundesliga on kicker.de

Bundesliga seasons
1
Germany